Houston Dynamo FC, commonly known as the Houston Dynamo, is an American professional soccer club based in Houston. The Dynamo compete in Major League Soccer (MLS) as a member of the Western Conference. Established on December 15, 2005, the club was founded after their former owners relocated the San Jose Earthquakes' players and staff to Houston following the 2005 season. For their first six seasons in Houston, the Dynamo were based at Robertson Stadium on the campus of the University of Houston. During the 2012 season, the club moved to Shell Energy Stadium, a soccer-specific stadium in East Downtown Houston.

The club is majority owned by Ted Segal, who fully controls ownership after buying out his remaining minority partners in August 2022.

The Houston Dynamo have been MLS Cup champions twice, winning during their first two seasons in 2006 and 2007. The club has also won the U.S. Open Cup once, in 2018. They have been MLS Cup runners-up twice, in 2011 and 2012, and Supporters' Shield runners-up once in 2008. The Dynamo have also reached the final of the now defunct North American SuperLiga, finishing as runners-up following a defeat against the New England Revolution.

History

Bringing an MLS club to Space City
MLS Commissioner Don Garber revealed on November 16, 2005, that the league had granted permission to San Jose Earthquakes' owners Anschutz Entertainment Group to relocate the team for the 2006 season, giving the entertainment giant 30 days to make a decision. Garber was in Houston and spoke with the media before an international friendly between Mexico and Bulgaria at Reliant Stadium, citing Houston as a next destination for an MLS club whether the Earthquakes moved or not.

On December 15, 2005, Major League Soccer announced that all players and coaches under contract to the Earthquakes would move to Houston. The Earthquakes name, colors and competition records were retained by the league for a possible expansion team. That team would take the field in 2008. As a result, the Earthquakes are now reckoned as having suspended operations in 2006 and 2007, while the Dynamo are reckoned as a 2006 expansion team.

A ceremony was held outside Houston City Hall on December 16, 2005, to officially announce the franchise's arrival. Mayor Bill White joined city council members, Harris County officials, local soccer organizers and fans in welcoming team coach Dominic Kinnear and players Pat Onstad and Wade Barrett with cowboy boots and hats. It was disclosed that the team would train and play at the University of Houston's Robertson Stadium on a three-year lease with the university earning a percentage of the revenues from concessions, parking and other sources.

In an immediate effort to plant roots in the community, AEG president and CEO Tim Leiweke announced former Houston Oilers quarterback Oliver Luck as the team's president and general manager. A previous NFL Europe executive, Luck had served as the head of the Harris County-Houston Sports Authority since 2001 and was instrumental in pursuing an MLS team for the city while also overseeing the construction of Minute Maid Park (home of the Astros), Reliant Stadium (home to the Texans) and the Toyota Center (home to the Rockets) during his tenure.

Early years (2006–10)

The newly relocated Houston team was named Houston 1836, paying homage to the city's founding date and the logo featured a silhouette of the Statue of Sam Houston, in Hermann Park. Immediate backlash to the 1836 was voiced by the Mexican community claiming that date, the year of the Texas Revolution was not a date that should be celebrated. Ownership, more concerned with the Mexican fans than the native Houstonians, decided to change the name to the Houston Dynamo stripping the franchise of the Sam Houston logo.

The Dynamo played their first regular season game on April 2, 2006, at Robertson Stadium in front of a crowd of 25,462. The Dynamo beat Colorado Rapids 5–2, with Brian Ching scoring four goals, with all four assisted by Dwayne De Rosario. The Dynamo finished their first season with an 11–8–13 record, earning them second place in the Western Conference. In the playoffs, they eliminated both Chivas USA and the Rapids 3–1, in the Western Conference to advance to the MLS Cup.

The championship match was scoreless until the second half of extra time, when New England's Taylor Twellman scored. One minute later, Brian Ching headed in the tying goal for Houston. The cup final became the first time in MLS history, that was decided by a penalty shootout. Houston beat the New England Revolution 4–3 on penalty kicks to win the 2006 MLS Cup. Kelly Gray and Stuart Holden scored Houston's first two penalty kicks. Dwayne De Rosario and Brian Ching scored the last two. By winning the 2006 MLS Cup, Houston qualified for the 2007 CONCACAF Champions Cup for the first time in club history.

Back to Back Champions

Houston began the 2007 season by competing in the 2007 CONCACAF Champions' Cup. After winning a quarterfinal against Costa Rican team Puntarenas F.C., Houston exited the competition in the semifinals, beating Mexican team Pachuca 2–0 in the first leg but losing 5–2 after extra time in the return leg.

Houston began its 2007 MLS league season with shutouts against Los Angeles Galaxy and Chivas USA. The team would continue to struggle in the regular season. During the season, Houston made some significant trades. They traded Kevin Goldthwaite and a first-round pick in the 2008 SuperDraft to Toronto FC for Richard Mulrooney. The team also traded Alejandro Moreno to Columbus Crew in exchange for Joseph Ngwenya. And they traded Kelly Gray to Los Angeles Galaxy for Nate Jaqua. After winning against FC Dallas, Houston began an unbeaten streak of eleven games and a shutout streak of 726 minutes, an MLS record.

Following their comebck, Houston finished as the second seed in the regular season clinching the 2007 MLS Cup Playoffs. Their first opponent in the playoff were rivals FC Dallas. Dallas won the first leg 1–0, but Houston won the second leg at Robertson Stadium, 4–1 in extra time, to win 4–2 on aggregate. Houston faced the Kansas City Wizards in the Western Conference final, winning 2–0 to advance to the MLS Cup championship game for the second year in a row. Just like in 2006, Houston faced the New England Revolution for the championship.  Houston won 2–1 on a game-winning goal by Dwayne De Rosario in the second half, thus winning their second MLS Cup in a row.

Partnership with Golden Boy promotions
Late in 2007, Major League Soccer informed Dynamo owners Anschutz Entertainment Group that they should divest their interest in the Dynamo, as they wanted each ownership group to own only one team.  AEG also owns the Los Angeles Galaxy. On November 21, 2007, it was announced that AEG was in negotiations to sell the Dynamo to a partnership of Brener International Group and Golden Boy Promotions, owned by the famed boxer Oscar De La Hoya.

On February 26, 2008, Houston Dynamo President Oliver Luck revealed the planned negotiations to the media stating that the Houston Dynamo would be managed in majority by original owners Anschutz Entertainment Group (who held 50% of ownership) along with newfound partners Gabriel Brener, head of Brener International Group, and multiple World and Olympic boxing champion Oscar De La Hoya (each with 25% ownership). De La Hoya has been seen wearing Dynamo colors on his boxing uniform with a small Houston Dynamo logo on his right leg in a fight against boxer Steve Forbes. He has also pledged to help find Dynamo a soccer-specific stadium, though he has been too busy with training to participate significantly in Dynamo decision-making. He has said he would become more involved once he retires in 2009, but has yet to do so even ten years later.

The Dynamo participated in the inaugural Pan-Pacific Championship debuted on February 20, 2008, in Honolulu, Hawaii. Houston qualified to participate in the tournament via their win as MLS Cup Champions. The Houston Dynamo won their first match against Sydney FC, before finishing second place after their 6–1 loss to Gamba Osaka in the final match. The Dynamo was back on the pitch competing in the CONCACAF Champions' Cup (qualifying as the 2007 MLS Cup Champions). The Dynamo played Municipal in the Quarterfinals winning 3–1 on aggregate (0–0, 3–1) at Robertson Stadium. The club lost to Deportivo Saprissa on 3–0 aggregate (0–0, 0–3) at Estadio Ricardo Saprissa.

Houston began their regular season home opener in a 3–3 draw with Texas Derby rival, FC Dallas, after falling behind twice before a game-tying goal in the 93rd minute. The Dynamo went 0–2–4, before getting their first league win of the season in a 2–1 win over the Colorado Rapids. The Dynamo went on a 5–0–4 run to finish the season 13–5–12, claiming 1st in the Western Conference and 2nd overall (behind the Columbus Crew). The Western Conference Semifinals was played against the New York Red Bulls with the first leg finishing in a 1–1 draw at Giants Stadium, and the second leg moving to Robertson Stadium where the Red Bulls defeated the Dynamo 0–3 in front of more than 30,000 fans.

The Dynamo started the new year with a quick exit from the 2008–09 CONCACAF Champions League with a 1–4 aggregate loss (1–1, 0–3) to Atlante in the quarterfinals.

In the regular season, Houston went on an 11-game unbeaten streak (8–0–3) early in the season before losing to the Los Angeles Galaxy in June. The Dynamo were inconsistent the rest of the season while dealing with international competition, but still finished the season tied for first in the Western Conference with a 13–8–9 record, finishing second in the Western Conference. In the playoffs, Houston beat Seattle 1–0 on aggregate in extra time. The Dynamo then lost 0–2 in extra time to the Galaxy in the Western Conference final.
The Dynamo reached the semifinals of the 2009 U.S. Open Cup before losing to the expansion Seattle Sounders FC 1–2 in extra time, after former Dynamo player Nate Jaqua scored the game-tying goal in the 89th minute.

During the 2009–10 offseason, the Dynamo saw the departures of two key players, Ricardo Clark to Eintracht Frankfurt and Stuart Holden to Bolton Wanderers.

The 2010 season kicked off with a 1–1 draw against FC Dallas at Pizza Hut Park. In the home opener against Real Salt Lake saw Brian Ching suffered a hamstring strain, which kept him out for 4–6 weeks. Later in the season, Geoff Cameron was off the roster, after rupturing his PCL during a game against the Chicago Fire; losing 2–0. Cameron eventually returned in August. The Dynamo finished the season 9–15–6 (7th West, 12th overall), and missed the playoffs for the first time since the 2006 season. The Dynamo finished strong, however, with the club's only winning streak at the end of the season against playoff-bound teams at San Jose (1–0) on October 16 and at home against Seattle (2–1) on October 23.

During the 2010 Lamar Hunt U.S. Open Cup. The club defeated Miami FC, 1–0, on June 29 before losing to Chivas USA, 1–3 in the Quarterfinals on July 6 (both games at Robertson Stadium). The Dynamo also competed in the 2010 North American SuperLiga, winning the group before exiting after a 0–1 loss to Morelia on August 5 at Robertson Stadium.

Competing in the Eastern Conference (2011–14)
The Dynamo switched to the Eastern Conference for the 2011 season, after teams were added in Vancouver and Portland. The team ended the regular season in second place in the Eastern Conference with a record of twelve wins, nine losses, and thirteen draws for 49 points. This record was fueled by MVP candidate Brad Davis's league-leading 16 assists.

In the Eastern Conference semi-finals, the Dynamo were matched up in a series against the Philadelphia Union, which the Dynamo won 3–1 in the home and home series. For the Eastern Conference Final, the Dynamo traveled to Kansas City. Brad Davis was injured in the first half, but despite this blow, the Dynamo scored twice to earn their ticket to the MLS Final and a chance to face the Los Angeles Galaxy. 
Los Angeles's Home Depot Center had been selected to host the 2011 MLS Final. Two seasons prior, the Dynamo faced the Galaxy there in the Western Conference Final, during which several blackouts occurred. The Dynamo were not able to power through the game, surrendering a goal to Landon Donovan in the 72nd minute.

After completion of their new stadium, the Dynamo made a victorious home debut on May 12, 2012, vs. D.C. United thanks to a Brad Davis strike in front of a capacity crowd of 22,039 that would mark the beginning of what would be an unbeaten year for the Dynamo at home, posting a year-end home record of 11–0–6. In the playoffs, the Dynamo traveled to Chicago to face the Chicago Fire.  Buoyed by two goals by Will Bruin, the Dynamo held on to a 2–1 victory in Chicago. The Dynamo then faced the top seed in the Eastern Conference, Sporting Kansas City in the Eastern Conference Semi-finals, played over two legs.  Behind goals from Adam Moffat and Will Bruin.  In front of a crowd of 20,894, Kansas City defeated the Dynamo 1–0, but the Dynamo survived 2–1 on aggregate.

Cup Final rematch
The Dynamo advanced to face D.C. United in the Eastern Conference Finals, with the first leg being played in Houston. Houston won the first leg 3–1, behind goals from Andre Hainault, Will Bruin, and Kofi Sarkodie in front of 22,101. In the second leg, a 33rd-minute goal from Oscar Boniek García gave the Dynamo a 1–1 draw, and the Dynamo held on for a 4–2 aggregate win and advanced to their second straight MLS Cup, in a rematch to face the Los Angeles Galaxy.

MLS Cup 2012 was hosted by L.A. with a sellout crowd of 30,510. After getting a goal from Calen Carr in the 44th minute, he would get injured later in the Cup match. One minute after this injury, the Galaxy equalized through Omar Gonzalez's header. Five minutes later, Landon Donovan sealed the Dynamo's fate just as he had the year before with a penalty after Ricardo Clark handled the ball in the area. Robbie Keane added a third goal for LA, who would win their fourth MLS Cup.

During the 2012 season, the Dynamo were undefeated at home, part of what would eventually become a 36-match unbeaten streak in all competitions. Will Bruin emerged in his 2nd year with the team as their leading goal-scorer. The Dynamo topped their group in the 2012–13 CONCACAF Champions League, where they moved on to face Santos Laguna in the round of 16 of the competition to be played March 5, 2013.  By finishing as runners-up in MLS Cup, they were awarded a berth in the 2013–14 CONCACAF Champions League as well.

The 2013 Dynamo season saw the men in orange continue their home dominance with a 9–4–4 record. Their 36 consecutive game home-win streak ended by Sporting Kansas City on May 12, 2013, in a 0–1 loss, from Aurelien Collin heading home the winner. Nevertheless, the Dynamo clinched a playoff berth yet again as a 4-seed with a 14–11–9 overall record. Houston faced Montreal in a heated contest for the MLS Wildcard Match to open the postseason at BBVA Stadium. Will Bruin continued his torrid postseason run of goals with a brace in a 3–0 rout against Le Impact.

The Dynamo then had to face New York Red Bulls who had bested them during the regular season in all three meetings, and it looked like they would thrash the Dynamo in the playoffs as well after the Red Bulls jumped out to a 2–0 lead during the first leg in Houston. Ricardo Clark was able to get on the board at the 50', and Omar Cummings, recently returned to full form, scored in stoppage time to complete the Dynamo exciting comeback. The 2nd leg in New York proved to be just as exciting. Bradley Wright-Phillips put the Red Bulls in the series lead again in the 23', but Brad Davis punished a mistake from the Red Bull defense to level the score before the half. Enter Omar Cummings for the second time, and for a second time, he scored a thrilling stoppage-time goal to put the Houston Dynamo into the Conference Championship for the 3rd consecutive year.

Unfortunately for the Dynamo, that would be as far as they would go. After an uninspired draw at home against Sporting Kansas City, the future champions, the Dynamo would fall 2–1 to Sporting on the return leg in Kansas. However, 2013 would still be considered another in a long line of successes for the Dynamo, and the team had their core players all locked into long-term contracts for the future.

On July 1, 2014, following two years without jersey sponsorship, the Houston Dynamo announced a multi-year jersey sponsorship with BHP Billiton. Dominic Kinnear was the head coach. Brad Davis was the team captain. On July 23, 2014, the Dynamo signed DeMarcus Beasley from Puebla. The team finished 8th in the Eastern Conference, having the 14th most points in the nineteen-team league, and did not make the playoffs for only the second time ever.

2015–present  
Along with Sporting Kansas City, The Dynamo moved to the Western Conference before the start of the 2015 season. Owen Coyle was named the new head coach, and Brad Davis continued as captain. Houston once again finished eighth in the Western Conference, and finished fifteenth in the twenty-team league, again failing to make the playoffs. At the end of the 2015 season, the team announced that Brener had bought out AEG's remaining stake and was now the majority owner.

On May 25, 2016, the Houston Dynamo announced that they were parting ways with head coach Owen Coyle, by mutual agreement. On June 7, Wade Barrett took over as head coach. That season they went on to finish tenth and last in the West on thirty-four points with an average attendance of approximately 20,000. Wilmer Cabrera was named the new head coach on October 28, 2016, replacing Wade Barrett.

For the 2017 season the team finished 4th in the West. This saw them clinch their first playoff berth since 2013. They made a deep run in the post season, but lost to Seattle Sounders FC in the MLS Western Conference Finals.

The 2018 season saw the first U.S. Open Cup title in franchise history when the team beat the Philadelphia Union 3–0 in the final. This qualified the Dynamo for the 2019 CONCACAF Champions League, their first appearance in the competition since 2013. However the team once again failed to qualify for the playoffs, prompting calls for new ownership as Brener and De La Hoya remained quiet about the team's woes.

The Dynamo started the 2019 season by competing in the CONCACAF Champions League and defeating C.D. Guastatoya in both legs of the first round. They then lost to Tigres UANL by an aggregate score of 3–0 in the quarterfinals. Houston participated in the inaugural Leagues Cup but were eliminated via penalties in the first round by Club America. After going through a 2–11–1 stretch during the summer, the Dynamo fired head coach Wilmer Cabrera. They were also unable to qualify for the MLS playoffs for the second consecutive year.

For the 2020 season, the Dynamo hired former U.S. men's national team player Tab Ramos as head coach, traded for former Minnesota United attacker Darwin Quintero and signed Croatian goalkeeper Marko Maric. However, they would go on to miss the playoffs for the sixth time in seven years, finishing at the bottom of the Western Conference during the shortened season. After the 2021 season the Houston Dynamo chose not to extend Tab Ramos's expiring contact after finishing bottom of the Western Conference for the second season in a row.

On 2 March 2022, The Houston Dynamo made their biggest signing in club history when they announced Héctor Herrera on a pre-contract agreement through the 2024 MLS season. He signed as a designated player.

Colors and badge

The official colors of the Dynamo crest are Wildcatter orange, Space City blue, and Raven black. The star on the original crest is an ad hoc adoption, likely a nod to the Houston, Texas Flag or the  "Houston 1836" crest concept.  It also retains the soccer ball with the star in the middle from the "1836" logo, though the shadow is changed to Space City blue.

With the 2006 MLS Cup win, a sanctioned star was added above the shield in 2008, after wearing the scudetto in 2007.  Since they won the MLS Cup again in 2007. they wore the scudetto for the second consecutive year in 2008. Consequently, a sanctioned star was added to the logo in 2009 for their win at MLS Cup 2007.

In 2020, the club rebranded as Houston Dynamo FC with a new logo. The new logo features a hexagonal shape to whose six sides represent the Dynamo's founding in 2006 and to reference the six wards that made up the original layout of the city. The crest also references Houston's bayou system with the channels within the interlocking monogram to represent Bayou City's waterways.

Name
Houston announced the name "Dynamo", on March 6, 2006, which refers to Houston's energy-based industrial economy, as well as a previous Houston soccer team, the Houston Dynamos who played in the Lone Star Soccer Alliance and United Soccer League. The official reason for the name is that "Dynamo is a word to describe someone who never fatigues, never gives up. The name is symbolic of Houston as an energetic, hard-working, risk-taking kind of town." 
The name "Dynamo" is also an homage to teams based out in the former Soviet Union republics and satellite states, such as Dynamo Moscow, Berliner FC Dynamo, Dynamo Dresden, 
FK Dinamo Tirana, Dynamo Kyiv, Dinamo Tbilisi, Dinamo București  and Dinamo Zagreb. The team colors are orange, white, and "Space City" blue or "Luv Ya Blue" (light blue), meant as a symbol of the city of Houston flag which is light blue and of yet another team in Houston's sports history – the NFL's Houston Oilers.

Originally, on January 25, 2006, the team had announced that Houston 1836 would be the team name. This followed an online survey for the fans to provide suggestions for the name. According to MLS & AEG, who chose the name, the 1836 name referred to the year that the city of Houston was founded by brothers Augustus Chapman Allen and John Kirby Allen.  The name had perceived ambiguity, however, as it is also the year of Texan independence from Mexico. Houston 1836's logo featured a silhouette of General Sam Houston, one of Houston's and Texas' most famous historical figures. The choice of Houston 1836 soon became a political issue. It raised a furor among some locals of Hispanic descent, a major target audience, who related 1836 with the war for Texas independence. Owing to protests from Hispanic fans, the name was changed to the Dynamo. MLS has since not allowed any online surveys to name expansion teams.

Stadiums

Shell Energy Stadium

On December 2, 2010, Harris County and the Houston Sports Authority reached an agreement for the 20,000–22,000-seat soccer-specific stadium in Downtown Houston east of Minute Maid Park, across Highway 59 which would be the third sporting facility for Downtown Houston. The venue, then under the name of 'BBVA Compass Stadium' for sponsorship reasons, opened on May 12, 2012, with a game against D.C. United.

On February 5, 2011, Houston Dynamo players, accompanied by Dynamo owner Philip Anschutz and Equity Partners Oscar De La Hoya and Gabriel Brener, Houston Mayor Annise Parker, Harris County Judge Ed Emmitt, Houston Dynamo President Chris Canetti, amongst others, participated in the groundbreaking of the Dynamo's new stadium in front of a few thousand fans. Construction began later that month.

Spectators will be able to experience unobstructed views from both the lower and upper seating bowls, which are supported by a single concourse. The concourse provides full access around the stadium with easy access to concession and toilet facilities. The fan experience will be enhanced by modern sound and video elements throughout the stadium. Fully integrated broadcast facilities will allow viewers and listeners to feel part of the atmosphere.

Aside from Major League Soccer and international soccer matches, the stadium also hosts Texas Southern University football, concerts, boxing matches, and much more. With its downtown location, the new stadium is now a part of a true Stadium District, which already features Minute Maid Park and Toyota Center, as well as other amenities and attractions such as the George R. Brown Convention Center, the Hilton Americas, Discovery Green, and Houston Pavilions.

On June 13, 2019, it was announced that BBVA Compass Stadium was changing its name to BBVA Stadium following the sponsor's rebrand.

During the second half of the 2021 season, BBVA Stadium was rebranded as PNC Stadium following PNC Financial Services' acquisition of BBVA USA in June 2021.

On January 17, 2023, PNC Stadium became Shell Energy Stadium following Shell Energy and the Dynamo agreeing on a stadium naming rights deal reportedly worth $40 million over 8 years.

Houston Sports Park

The training facility for the Dynamo first team and academy teams is located at the Houston Sports Park (HSP). Opened in 2011, the complex features seven soccer fields, field lighting, and parking. All of the fields feature Bermuda grass, except one that contains FieldTurf. One of the fields, entitled the Methodist Champions Field, is reserved exclusively for use by the Dynamo and visiting professional teams. The remaining fields are available for public rental. The training facility includes a Methodist Hospital physical therapy center and Athlete Training + Health Performance facility. The complex, located 10 miles south of PNC Stadium, was built through a partnership with the City of Houston.

Club culture

Supporters

The Dynamo enjoyed good fan support in its first season. Their first ever match attracted 25,462 fans against Colorado Rapids on April 2, 2006.  Attendance gradually declined throughout the remainder of the spring and summer months. During July and August, they played five matches at Robertson Stadium, and the average attendance for those matches was 10,348.

The team's attendance figures received a boost on August 9 when they played a game against Los Angeles Galaxy in Houston's Reliant Stadium as part of a double-header, with the other game being an exhibition match between FC Barcelona and Mexican side Club América, which attracted a crowd of 70,550. Home attendance began to rise again as the weather cooled and the playoffs approached.

For the 2006 season, they averaged 18,935 over the 16 regular season home games. Attendance remained high during their playoff run, where home attendance was 17,440 and 23,107 in games against Chivas USA and Colorado Rapids. Dynamo fans contributed greatly to the sell-out crowd of 22,427 in the 2006 MLS Cup, which was played about 275 miles (450 km) from Houston, in Frisco.

There are currently three officially recognized supporter groups, El Batallón. La Bateria and Brickwall Firm are former supporter groups.

Mascot
In 2007, Houston started a search for a mascot by asking members of the Art Institute of Houston to submit drawings, from which several finalists were selected and an official mascot would be decided through an online poll, both for the mascot design and name. The winning design, by Eric Hulsey and Leslie Lopez, was of an orange-haired fox and named Dynamo Diesel. He was unveiled at Houston Zoo on April 3, 2007. Dynamo Diesel began working alongside the Houston Dynamo marketing and community outreach programs. He is not only present at games, cheering on the team, but also joins the Houston dancers, the Dynamo Girls helping to promote the Dynamo in Houston.

Rivalries

The Houston Dynamo's main rival is FC Dallas, who they play in the Texas Derby. Since the introduction of Austin FC in 2021, the three teams compete for the Copa Tejas, a trophy handed out to the best MLS team in the state.

The Dynamo have also developed a rivalry with Sporting Kansas City after facing each other in the playoffs and the US Open Cup multiple times.

Revenue and profitability
The Dynamo's revenues increased significantly when they moved to BBVA Stadium in 2012, propelling the team into profitability and doubling season ticket sales – according to club President Chris Canetti. A 2015 study by Forbes listed the Dynamo as the third-most valuable franchise ($200 million) based on financial data – including estimates of revenue ($26 million, 6th) and operating income ($5 million, 3rd) – from the 2014 season. In a 2016 ranking by Forbes Mexico, the Houston Dynamo were valued at $215 million – the tenth-best among soccer clubs of the Americas. The latest Forbes valuation has the club valued at $280 million

Broadcasting
From 2023, every Dynamo match is available via MLS Season Pass on the Apple TV app. Prior to this all-streaming deal, the club was aired on various TV stations in the Houston market, as well as whichever linear MLS TV partner had national rights.

Radio
In February 2016, the Dynamo announced the start of a new multiyear deal with CBS Radio Houston. CBS Sports Radio 650 will serve as the home of the Dynamo with specific games airing on SportsRadio 610. CBS Sports Radio 650 will also broadcast a half-hour pregame and ancillary programming such as The Players Show and The Coaches Show, both of which will also be broadcast on KKHH 95.7 HD-3 as well as streaming online at www.houston.cbslocal.com, and via the Radio.com app. Promotional partnerships will extend across the FM brands with on-air features and programming airing on their sister radio stations.

Players and staff

Current roster

Out on loan

Head coaches 

Note: Record for MLS Regular season games only. As of November 8, 2022.

General managers

Staff

Affiliates and club academy 

The Dynamo Academy was created in 2007 and led by Director of Youth Development James Clarkson.  On February 27, 2009, the Dynamo signed Tyler Deric, their first homegrown player in club history.  The following season Francisco Navas Cobo became the second HGP in Dynamo history.  On April 17, 2010, Navas Cobo became the first academy alum to appear in an MLS game for the Dynamo.  Alex Dixon became the first academy alum to score a goal with his stoppage time winner against Real Salt Lake on August 20, 2011.

The Dynamo Academy has trained and played their games at Houston Sports Park since it opened in 2011.  Prior to that, they used multiple fields around the city.

The Dynamo Academy is currently run by Academy Director Paul Holocher.

For 2014 and 2015, USL-Pro team Charleston Battery was an affiliate with the Dynamo, letting Houston send players there on loan.

In late 2014, the Dynamo met with USL officials about creating a USL team. Rio Grande Valley FC Toros replaced Charleston as the Dynamo's USL affiliate for the 2016 season. The Dynamo ran all soccer operations for the club, sending academy players as well as fringe first team players and players rehabbing from injury to train and play with the Toros throughout the year.  In December 2020, RGVFC and the Dynamo restructured the relationship, giving the Toros control over all aspects of their soccer operations. Following the 2021 season, the agreement ended, allowing Rio Grande Valley FC to become an independent club.

Brazos Valley Cavalry has served as the Dynamo's USL League Two affiliate since 2017.

On December 6, 2021, it was announced that the Dynamo would field a team, Houston Dynamo 2, in the inaugural season of MLS Next Pro in 2022.  The team plays their games at Aveva Stadium, part of Houston Sports Park.

The Dynamo also own the Houston Dash of the NWSL.

Honors

Domestic
League
MLS Cup
Champions (2): 2006, 2007

Cups
U.S. Open Cup
Champions (1): 2018

Seasons

This is a partial list of the last five seasons completed by the Dynamo. For the full season-by-season history, see List of Houston Dynamo seasons.

1. Avg. attendance include statistics from league matches only.
2. Top goalscorer(s) includes all goals scored in League, MLS Cup Playoffs, U.S. Open Cup, MLS is Back Tournament, CONCACAF Champions League, FIFA Club World Cup, and other competitive continental matches.

Team records

International tournaments

By virtue of their MLS Cup victories, the Dynamo entered the CONCACAF Champions Cup and the North American SuperLiga. During the 2008 season, the Dynamo participated in the inaugural Pan-Pacific Championship as well as the inaugural CONCACAF Champions League. The Dynamo participated in the final two seasons of the CONCACAF Champions Cup tournament reaching the semi-finals both times. They have also competed in five editions of the CONCACAF Champions League and reached the quarterfinals on three occasions.

Career records

Games played:  Brad Davis (271)
Goals:  Brian Ching (56)
Assists:  Brad Davis (104)
Shots:  Brad Davis (473)
Wins:  Pat Onstad (53)
Shutouts:  Pat Onstad (37)
Saves:  Pat Onstad (384)

MLS regular season only, through December 19, 2019

Season records
 Goals:  Mauro Manotas – 19 (2018)
 Assists:  Brad Davis – 16 (2011)
 Shutouts:  Tally Hall – 12 (2013)
MLS regular season only

Player awards

League awards

MLS Best XI 

 2006: Dwayne De Rosario, Ricardo Clark
 2007: Dwayne De Rosario, Eddie Robinson
 2009: Geoff Cameron, Stuart Holden
 2011: Brad Davis

MLS All-Star 

 2006: Brian Ching, Dwayne De Rosario, Eddie Robinson, Ricardo Clark
 2007: Brian Ching, Dwayne De Rosario, Ricardo Clark
 2008: Brian Ching, Dwayne De Rosario, Pat Onstad
 2009: Brad Davis, Brian Ching, Geoff Cameron, Pat Onstad, Stuart Holden
 2010: Brad Davis, Brian Ching
 2011: Brad Davis, Corey Ashe, Geoff Cameron, Tally Hall
 2012: Brad Davis, Geoff Cameron
 2013: Brad Davis, Corey Ashe
 2015: DaMarcus Beasley
 2017: DaMarcus Beasley
 2018: Alberth Elis

Goal of the Year

2006: Brian Ching

Save of the Year

2009: Pat Onstad

Fair Play Player award

2017: DaMarcus Beasley

Team Awards

Attendance

Average season attendance

Highest attended matches

References

External links

 

 
Association football clubs established in 2005
Dynamo
2005 establishments in Texas
Major League Soccer teams
U.S. Open Cup winners